Bethesda is an unincorporated community in Douglas Township, Page County, Iowa, United States.

History
Bethesda's population was 54 in 1902, and 25 in 1925.

References

Unincorporated communities in Page County, Iowa
Unincorporated communities in Iowa